"A Good Year for the Roses" is a ballad written by Jerry Chesnut and originally recorded by American country singer George Jones.  It rose to #2 on the country singles chart in 1970.

Background
"A Good Year for the Roses" describes the thoughts of a man as his wife leaves him, and is as good an example as any of Jones' ability to deliver an intensely moving vocal, in this case one that conveys both the sadness and profound bitterness that comes with a broken marriage.  Although recorded while George was with Musicor, the production is typical of the sound Billy Sherrill would employ when Jones moved to Epic Records the following year.  Although supported by a choir of background singers and strings on the chorus, Jones' vocal is the centerpiece throughout, with Chris Woodstra of AllMusic calling it "one of his all-time greatest performances." The lyric, infused by Jones' nuanced delivery, captures the disillusion of the narrator.

Jones recorded two versions of the song; the second can be heard on the A Good Year for the Roses: The Complete Musicor Recordings 1965-1971.  Jones also cut the song with Alan Jackson as a duet in 1994 for the Bradley Barn Sessions, but was disappointed with its reception by country radio, noting in his autobiography, "Alan was white-hot on the radio, and programmers wanted his voice.  But some didn't want his if they had to take mine.  The vast majority of Alan's other single records have gone to number one.  His duet with me was his first not to crack the top 50."  It actually peaked at number 57.  In June 1995, the song won the Music City News Country Awards "Vocal Collaboration of the Year."

Other notable recordings
Elvis Costello scored a No. 6 hit in the UK Singles Chart with the song in 1981.

Video
The video for the Elvis Costello version of the song was shot at The Meldrum House Hotel, Oldmeldrum, Aberdeenshire on Wednesday 29th July 1981. The band were in the north east of Scotland to appear at the Aberdeen Country and Western Club on the 30th July, with the performance to be filmed by LWT Television.

Chart performance

George Jones version

Elvis Costello version

George Jones and Alan Jackson version

References

Bibliography

1970s ballads
1970 songs
1970 singles
1981 singles
1994 singles
George Jones songs
Alan Jackson songs
Musicor Records singles
MCA Nashville Records singles
Song recordings produced by Brian Ahern (producer)
Songs written by Jerry Chesnut
Male vocal duets
Elvis Costello songs
Country ballads